Blaenrhondda Association Football Club was an association football club based in the village of Blaenrhondda in Rhondda Cynon Taf, Wales. The club last played in the  South Wales Alliance League Premier Division, part of the Welsh football league system in South Wales but folded in July 2022.

History
The club had significant history in the Welsh Football League, including periods in the top two divisions from the 1970s to the 1990s.

After dropping out of the Welsh Football League the club played in the South Wales Amateur League, before dropping into the Rhondda & District League. The club joined the South Wales Alliance League for the 2017–18 season. Since then the club has secured back-to-back promotions - winning the second division in 2017–18 and finishing first division runners-up in the 2018–19 season, gaining promotion to the Premier Division.

Honours

 Welsh Football League Division One - Champions: 1991–92
 Welsh Football League Premier Division - Runners-Up: 1982–83
 Welsh Football League Division Two - Runners-Up: 1970–71 
 Welsh Football League Division Three - Runners-Up: 1996–97
 South Wales Alliance League Division Two - Runners-Up: 2018–19
 South Wales Alliance League Division Two - Champions: 2017–18
 Rhondda & District League Premier Division – Champions: 2016–17
 WJ Owen Cup – Winners: 2018

External links
 Official Twitter

References

1934 establishments in Wales
Welsh Football League clubs
South Wales Alliance League clubs
Sport in Rhondda Cynon Taf
Rhondda & District League
South Wales Amateur League clubs
Rhondda & District League clubs
Association football clubs established in 1934
2022 disestablishments in Wales
Association football clubs disestablished in 2022
Defunct football clubs in Wales